Mangala Bhatt is a prominent exponent, dancer, choreographer and guru of Kathak dance. She is the senior disciple of Kathak maestro Pt. Durga Lal Ji of Jaipur Gharana. Her solo, duet and group productions have been staged at numerous prestigious festivals in India for the last 35 years. She is also the founding director of Aakruti Kathak Kendra.

Early life 
Mangala was born in Kolhapur, Maharashtra and received her initial education in Kolhapur. She applied to the prestigious Kathak Kendra institute in New Delhi, India and got through on a national scholarship.

Career 
At Kathak Kendra, New Delhi, Mangala initially trained under late Shri Kundanlal Gangani Ji and later took advanced training under the Kathak Maestro late Pandit Durga Lal Ji, from whom she absorbed his brilliant technique and mastered the dazzling cadence and subtle nuances of Kathak. Her work and sincere efforts received praise and took her to major productions choreographed by Guru Pt. Durga Lal Ji and Pt Birju Maharaj Ji. She also took guidance from Guru Smt Rohini Bhate Ji much later. Mangala's abhinaya has been particularly appreciated because of her nuanced expression and inherent precision. Her artistic and aesthetic elegance have received high applause from both critic and rasika alike. She has been hailed as a dancer with grip over laya, neatly able to construct the structure of Kathak. A brilliant exponent of the Kathak form, her galaxy of performances are numerous and fabulous in their scintillating variety. She is particularly known to combine Kathak with other distinct art forms such as jazz drums, flamenco, qawwali, ghazals, performance poetry, kalaripayatu, modern dance, ballet, painting among others.

Personal life 
Mangala Bhatt is married to Kathak dancer and artist Raghav Raj Bhatt, whom she met while training at Kathak Kendra. Raghav Raj Bhatt is a prime disciple of Padma Bhushan Pt Birju Maharaj Ji. After their marriage, Mangala moved to Hyderabad, India to continue her work in Kathak. The dance duo is synonymous with Kathak. They bring together the confluence of two distinct styles of Kathak, representing Jaipur Gharana and Lucknow Gharana.

Works 
In 1990, Mangala along with her husband started Aakruti Kathak Kendra in Hyderabad, to take forward their mission of promoting, popularising and propagating classical Kathak dance. Where numerous students engage with Kathak through a range of activities such as weekly dance classes, workshops, lecture - demonstrations as well as research into the interfacing of Kathak with other Indian and Western art forms.

Mangala along with her husband have received many state, national and international accolades and awards for her enormous contribution in the field of arts and culture, and has also been conferred the prestigious Telangana State Award by Chief Minister K Chandrasekhar Rao. Mangala is an empanelled artist of Indian Council for Cultural Relations (ICCR), Doordarshan and has been associated with Sangeet Bharti, Kathak Kendra and ICCR for national and international projects. She has also proactively been a part of initiatives by organisations such as SPICMACAY, Heal a Child, Rotract and others, which integrate art and culture into the upliftment of the society. She regularly features in guest lectures at schools, institutions and bodies like the Centre for Cultural Resources and Training (CCRT). Besides this, Mangala also is the director and curator and host of Antarang, a music and dance festival held in Hyderabad every year.

See also 

 Pt Durga Lal Ji
 Pt Birju Maharaj Ji
 Kathak
 Raghav Raj Bhatt
 List of Kathak Exponents

References

External links 
 www.mangalaraghavkathak.com
 https://narthaki.com/kathak/ktk1ai.htm
 https://narthaki.com/info/rev18/rev2163.html
 https://narthaki.com/info/prv19/prv1349.html
 https://narthaki.com/newsletter/archive/nl_nov19.html
 https://narthaki.com/info/rev16/rev1888.html
 https://www.iccr.gov.in/cultural/list-of-empanelment-artist/bharat-folk-arts-academy"-shri-raghav-raj-bhatt
 https://www.lamakaan.com/index.php/event-page/?event_id=6495

https://www.tribuneindia.com/news/archive/chandigarh/3-day-kathak-utsav-in-city-530870
https://www.thehindu.com/news/cities/Hyderabad/poetry-slam-artiste-performs-at-hyderabad-literary-festival/article4328329.ece
https://www.sakshi.com/news/features/kathak-dance-raghav-raj-bhatt-couple-is-best-couple-166191
https://www.thehindu.com/society/arshiya-sethis-poems-on-depict-human-crises-amid-during-the-pandemic-go-visual-and-dancers-of-varied-forms-have-presented-her-poems-in-videos/article32182495.ece

Living people
Indian female dancers
People from Maharashtra
Kathak exponents
People from Telangana
Year of birth missing (living people)
Recipients of the Sangeet Natak Akademi Award